The marine conservation zones in Yorkshire, were created in 2016 and 2019 after an extensive consultation, which drew criticism of the UK Government's plans which designated only 31 zones out of the projected 127 zones in 2013. An £8 million study recommended the 127 sites, of which, eight lay in and around the coast of Yorkshire.

In June 2020. a review led by Richard Benyon MP, stated that nearly 50 areas around the UK coastline (three off the Yorkshire Coast), should become Highly Protected Marine Areas (HPMAs). This would see the banning of dredging, sewage dumping, drilling, offshore wind-turbine construction and catch-and-release sea fishing.

History
The Review of Marine Nature Conservation (RMNC) was established in 1999 to provide an effective framework for protection sections of the marine environment surrounding the United Kingdom. Before this, international agreements included the United Nations Conference on the Human Environment (1972), and the adoption ten years later by the UN General Assembly of the World Charter for Nature (1982, UN Resolution 37/7).

The Marine Conservation Zone Project was launched in 2008, to determine which areas around England, Wales and Northern Ireland should be awarded the status of a Marine Conservation Zone (MCZ), which led to the Marine and Coastal Access Act 2009. The project divided up the relevant parts of the United Kingdom into four areas; the South West was labelled Finding Sanctuary, the South East Balanced Seas, the Irish Sea area Irish Sea Conservation Zones, and the North Sea area as Net Gain. In September 2011, the four regional MCZ projects put forward their proposals for MCZs in their area.

No sites in Yorkshire were designated in the first tranche (2013); they were either designated in tranche 2 (2016), or tranche 3 (2019).

List of MCZs

Holderness Inshore
The MCZ extends from the shore to  out to sea and has a "wonderful mosaic of cobble, mixed sediment, sand and chalk, alongside patches of peat and clay". The shoreline and seabed support various fauna and algae as well as wrasse, European eel, dab, as well as commercially important crab and lobster.

Holderness Offshore
The site also overlaps the Southern North Sea Special Area of Conservation, which protects harbour porpoises.

Markham's Triangle
The area supports sand eels, which are food for many seabirds, with surveys revealing that grey seal and harbour porpoises that have been spotted swimming through the area. Markham's Triangle has been subjected to significant trawl fishing in recent years, which has scarred the seabed.

Runswick Bay

Runswick Bay was designated in the second tranche in January 2016, after CEFAS had conducted a survey of the Runswick Bay proposed site in 2014. It is recognised as being a Nationally Designated area of protection on the World database on Protected areas. The MCZ at Runswick Bay is host to shallow rocky areas which provide a refuge for crabs, anemones and starfish. The ground is also a good home for kelp and red seaweed. Mussels, limpets and barnacles are found closer to the shore, whilst the seabed provides for sponges, sea squirts and sea urchins. The MCZ also sees important visitors such as harbour porpoises and kittiwakes.

Deeper areas within the Runswick Bay zone are good spawning grounds for herring, sprat, cod and plaice. The designation mentions one key creature, the ocean quahog (arctica islandica), and ten types of rock and surface which are to be managed and protected; low energy intertidal rock, moderate energy intertidal rock, high energy intertidal rock, intertidal sand and muddy sand, moderate energy infralittoral rock, moderate energy circalittoral rock, subtidal coarse settlement, subtidal mixed sediments, subtidal sand, and subtidal mud.

Whilst there is no strategic plan on how to protect the MCZs, Runswick Bay has been a prohibited area for trawling "for decades". Dredging activity is also banned and netting is strictly controlled.

Proposed MCZs

Castle Ground
Castle Ground, located off the coast at Scarborough, was proposed by the wildlife trust for approval in the tranche 3 process. It is named after Scarborough Castle. Castle Ground is home to "seaweeds, sea hares, crabs and molluscs such as blue-rayed limpets. Anemones, sponges, starfish and brittlestars. During winter, Filey Brigg supports half the English purple sandpiper population and is important for foraging seabirds, such as kittiwakes. There are 225 creatures belonging to ten different families recorded on the Brigg itself."

Compass Rose
North Sea and the cooler waters of the northern North Sea occurs." The site is an important spawning ground for plaice, herring, lemon sole and sandeels. Additionally, it is an important nursery for cod, whiting and sprat.

Flamborough Head
Flamborough Head is a designated Special Area of Conservation. The site is the most northerly outcrop of chalk in the United Kingdom. The chalk erodes slower on the north side of Flamborough Head to the south side, but it does form rocky outcrops, headlands and cliffs. The site was designated on 1 April 2005. The site has been a no-take zone for the fishing industry for some time, and the proposed zone would have extended  out to sea.

Silver Pit
Silver Pit was put forward for the final tranche in 2019, but was not awarded MCZ status. The Silver Pit is a trench-like valley on the floor of the North Sea which was known to 19th century fishermen as being a good place to fish for flatfish such as sole and plaice. The deep trench is believed to have been carved out by glacial meltwater. The area has been tested and mapped, though this has been for possible hydrocarbons under the sea bed. Silver Pit has a variety of wildlife; mussels, brittle stars, sea squirts, queen scallops, squat lobsters and pink shrimp. The site is a spawning ground for lemon sole, sprat, whiting, cod, Dover sole, plaice and herring. It provides food for puffins, common guillemots, kittiwakes, fulmars and northern gannets. Minke whales, white-beaked dolphins and porpoises have also been observed in the area.

Future
In June 2020, a review stated that three areas of the Yorkshire coastline should become a strict exclusion zone for all types of activity including dredging, sewage dumping, drilling, offshore wind-turbine construction and catch-and-release sea fishing. The three areas would join over 40 others across the UK in becoming Highly Protected Marine Areas (HPMAs). Those noted for an HMPA were Markham's Triangle, Dogger Bank and Bempton Cliffs/Flamborough Head.

Notes

References

Sources

External links
Archived NetGain website on webarchive.nationalarchives.gov.uk

Fishing in England
Marine reserves of England
Lists of protected areas of the United Kingdom
Yorkshire coast